My Old, Familiar Friend is the fourth album by American musician Brendan Benson, released on August 18, 2009. The first single, "A Whole Lot Better," was released on the same day.
The album debuted at No. 110 on the Billboard Top 200 Albums in the US.

My Old, Familiar Friend was recorded in 2007, in between Benson's work on Broken Boy Soldiers and Consolers of the Lonely, as a member of The Raconteurs.

Track listing
All songs written by Brendan Benson, except where noted.

iTunes bonus track

Limited edition

References

Brendan Benson albums
2009 albums
Albums produced by Dave Sardy
Albums produced by Gil Norton
ATO Records albums